Brown's emo skink or golden forest skink (Emoia aurulenta) is a species of lizard in the family Scincidae. It is found in Papua New Guinea.

References

Emoia
Reptiles described in 1985
Taxa named by Walter Creighton Brown
Taxa named by Frederick Stanley Parker